Delores Marie Robinson is an American geophysicist who is a professor and department chair at the University of Alabama. Her research considers how orogenic systems evolve from porto-magmatic arcs, with a particular focus on Western Nepal, India, Bhutan and Southern Tibet.

Early life and education 
Robinson studied at the Guilford College, and graduated with a bachelor's degree in geology in 1994. She completed a research project on the gravity and magnetics of diabase dikes in Jamestown, North Carolina. She moved to Vanderbilt University for graduate studies, earning a master's degree in 1997. Her research involved the characterization of magma chamber dynamics in Aztec Wash pluton. Robinson became a doctoral student at the University of Arizona researching the kinematic history, structure and stratigraphy of Western Nepal. In 2001, Robinson was awarded a PhD. During Robinson's research in Western Nepal, she created a geological map.

Research and career 
Robinson started her professional career as a structural geologist at BP in Alaska. She was appointed to the faculty of the University of Alabama in 2003, and promoted to Professor and Chair of Geological Sciences in 2010. Her research has considered the tectonics of the Himalayas. In an effort to identify hidden hydrocarbons, Robinson collects and analyzes rocks and makes use of seismic data.

Selected publications

Awards and honors 
 2018 Elected Fellow of the Geological Society of America

Personal life 
Robinson is married with four children.

References 

 

American geophysicists
Women geophysicists
University of Alabama faculty
Living people
Year of birth missing (living people)
Fellows of the Geological Society of America
Guilford College alumni
Vanderbilt University alumni